This is a chart of stringed instrument tunings.  Instruments are listed alphabetically by their most commonly known name.

Terminology 

A course may consist of one or more strings.

Courses are listed reading from left to right facing the front of the instrument, with the instrument standing vertically. On a majority of instruments, this places the notes from low to high pitch.
Exceptions exist: 
Instruments using reentrant tuning (e.g., the charango) may have a high string before a low string. 
Instruments strung in the reverse direction (e.g. mountain dulcimer) will be noted with the highest sounding courses on the left and the lowest to the right.
A few instruments exist in "right-hand" and "left-hand" versions; left-handed instruments are not included here as separate entries, as their tuning is identical to the right-hand version, but with the strings in reverse order (e.g., a left-handed guitar).

Strings within a course are also given from left to right, facing the front of the instrument, with it standing vertically. Single-string courses are separated by spaces; multiple-string courses (i.e. paired or tripled strings) are shown with courses separated by bullet characters (•).

Pitch: Unless otherwise noted, contemporary western standard pitch (A4 = 440 Hz) and 12-tone equal temperament are assumed.

Octaves are given in scientific pitch notation, with Middle C written as "C4".  (The 'A' above Middle C would then be written as "A4"; the next higher octave begins on "C5"; the next lower octave on "C3"; etc.)

Because stringed instruments are easily re-tuned, the concept of a "standard tuning" is somewhat flexible. Some instruments:
 have a designated standard tuning (e.g., violin; guitar)
 have more than one tuning considered "standard" (e.g. mejorana, ukulele)
 do not have a standard tuning but rather a "common" tuning that is used more frequently than others (e.g., banjo; lap steel guitar)
 are typically re-tuned to suit the music being played or the voice being accompanied and have no set "standard" at all (e.g., đàn nguyệt; Appalachian dulcimer)

Where more than one common tuning exists, the most common is given first and labeled "Standard" or "Standard/common". Other tunings will then be given under the heading "Alternates".

A

B

C

D

E

F

G

H

I

J

K

L

M

N

O

P

Q

R

S

T

U

V

W

X

Y

Z

Zither Tuning Chart

Notes

See also
 Bass Guitar Tunings
 Guitar Tunings
 Plucked string instrument list
 Scale (string instruments)
 Scordatura
 Violin Tuning

References
Brody, David; The Fiddler's Fakebook: The Ultimate Sourcebook For The Traditional Fiddler; Music Sales America (1992).  
Dearling, Robert; Stringed Instruments; Chelsea House Publishing (2000).  
Hanson, Mark; The Complete Book of Alternate Guitar Tunings; Music Sales America (1995).  
Marcuse, Sibyl; Musical Instruments:  A Comprehensive Dictionary; W. W. Norton & Company (1975).  
Piston, Walter; Orchestration; W. W. Norton & Company (1955). 
Randell, D. M. (editor); Harvard Dictionary of Music, 4th Edition; Belknap Press of Harvard University Press (2003).

External links
Atlas of Plucked Instruments
The Synthesis of Taiwanese and Western Musical Elements: A Case Study of the Zheng Concerto—Dots, Lines, and Convergence by Chihchun Chi-Sun Lee
Chapman Stick Tunings
Hurdy-gurdy Tuning
Koto Tunings
Zither Tuning

Musical tuning
Guitar tunings